Members of the New South Wales Legislative Council who served from 1872 to 1874 were appointed for life by the Governor on the advice of the Premier. This list includes members between the beginning of the 1872 colonial election on 13 February 1872 and the beginning of the 1874–75 colonial election on 8 December 1874. The President was Sir Terence Murray until his death on 22 June 1873 and then John Hay.

See also
Third Martin ministry (1870–1872)
First Parkes ministry (1872–1875)

Notes

References

 

Members of New South Wales parliaments by term
19th-century Australian politicians